Rafael Vieira Vilar known by his stage name Raf Vilar, is a Brazilian singer and songwriter based in London.

Early life 
Vilar was born and raised in Rio de Janeiro and began studying music at the age of 13. After graduating in Journalism at age 22, Vilar moved to London.

Career 
In 2011, Vilar released his debut album Studies in Bossa on Far Out Recordings, a British label that specialises in bringing Brazilian music to Europe. The album featured on the World Music charts in Japan and opened the door for Vilar to perform in venues such as The Shrine Harlem in New York, Somerset House and Ronnie Scotts in London. He has recorded a session at BBC Maida Vale Studios and released Studies in Bossa Deluxe in 2013.

Discography
2011 – Studies in Bossa (Far Out Recordings)

2013 – Studies in Bossa Deluxe (Far Out Recordings)

2015 – High Class Cat (Far Out Recordings) 

2022 – Clichê (Ajabú!)

References

External links
 
 on Far Out Records

Living people
Brazilian singer-songwriters
Year of birth missing (living people)